The Concurrent Design Facility (CDF) is the European Space Agency main assessment center for future space missions and industrial review. Located at ESTEC, ESA's technical center in Noordwijk in The Netherlands, it has been operational since early 2000.

As suggested by its name, the CDF uses concurrent engineering methodology to perform effective, fast and cheap space mission studies. Equipped with a state-of-the-art network of computers, multimedia devices and software tools, the CDF allows teams of experts to perform design studies during working sessions.

Activities
The CDF is mainly in charge of performing the assessment studies of future missions for the European Space Agency. These assessment studies are performed in the early phases of mission and spacecraft design; the so-called "Phase 0" or "Pre-phase A" of the ESA Project Phases in which needs are identified and Mission Analysis is performed.

Phase 0 focusses the following:

Identification and characterisation of the intended mission. 
Expression in terms of needs, expected performance and dependability and safety goals.space 
Assessment of operating constraints, in particular as regards the physical and operational environment. 
Identification of possible system concepts, with emphasis on the degree of innovation and any critical aspect. 
Preliminary assessment of project management data (organisation, costs, schedules).

Current main activities
In addition to the "normal" studies, the CDF is currently being used as the assessment center for the ESA Cosmic Vision program.

List of assessment studies
A list of assessment studies accomplished by the CDF is:

List of reviews

Facility

The CDF design room was designed and equipped with relevant hardware and software tools, with the aim of creating an effective communication and data interchange environment among team members.  In 2008, ESA donated its older CDF facility to the International Space University (ISU) in Strasbourg, for educational purposes.

See also 
 ECSS-E-TM-10-25A
 Open Concurrent Design Server
 Concurrent engineering
 Advanced Concepts Team

References

External links
ESA CDF website 
CDF published reports 
RHEA Group RHEA Group Concurrent Design Engineering
DLR System Analysis and Space Segments

Spaceflight
European Space Agency
Noordwijk